King Edward Memorial Hospital may refer to:

 King Edward Memorial Hospital and Seth Gordhandas Sunderdas Medical College in Mumbai, India
 King Edward Memorial Hospital for Women in Subiaco, Western Australia
 King Edward VII Memorial Hospital, Stanley, Falkland Islands